Hell's Kitchen Suomi is the Finnish adaption of British reality show Hell's Kitchen that was created by Gordon Ramsay, who was also the head chef. Top Chef  is the head chef. The series started airing on 20 September 2013 on MTV3. This version stays true to the American version with the participants and the customers not being celebrities, with the broadcast recorded weekly instead of being broadcast live nightly, with no presenter and just a voice-over, with a challenge in which the winner wins a reward and the loser faces a punishment. After dinner service, Kemppainen names a winning team while the losing team nominates two of its team members for elimination to be decided by Kemppainen instead of the viewing public.

Seasons

References

External links
 

2013 Finnish television series debuts
2013 Finnish television series endings
Finnish reality television series
MTV3 original programming
Hell's Kitchen (TV series)
Finnish television series based on British television series
Finnish non-fiction television series